The 1979 West Virginia Mountaineers football team represented West Virginia University in the 1979 NCAA Division I-A football season. It was the Mountaineers' 87th overall season and they competed as a Division I-A Independent. The team was led by head coach Frank Cignetti Sr., in his fourth year, and played their final season of home games at Mountaineer Field in Morgantown, West Virginia. They finished the season with a record of five wins and six losses (5–6 overall).

Schedule

Roster

References

West Virginia
West Virginia Mountaineers football seasons
West Virginia Mountaineers football